The 16569 / 16570 Yesvantpur–Kacheguda Express is  an Express train belonging to South Western Railway zone of Indian Railways that run between  and  in India.

Background
This train was inaugurated on 1 March 2014, Flagged off by Mallikarjun Kharge Former Minister of Railways for more connectivity between Bangalore and Hyderabad.

Service
The frequency of this train is three days a week, it covers the distance of 612 km with an average speed of 46 km/hr.

Routes

Traction
As this route is going to be electrified, a KJM-based WDP-4D locomotive pulls the train to its destination on both directions.

External links
 16569 Yesvantpur–Kacheguda Express
 16570 Kacheguda–Yesvantpur Express

References

Express trains in India
Transport in Bangalore
Transport in Hyderabad, India
Rail transport in Karnataka
Rail transport in Andhra Pradesh
Rail transport in Telangana